Professor Rachapalem Chandrasekhara Reddy  is an Indian writer and teacher.  He won the Telugu-language Kendra Sahitaya Academy Award in 2014.

See also
List of Sahitya Akademi Award winners in Telugu

References

External links
Professor Rachapalem Chandrasekhara Reddy Profile at the Yogi Vemana University website

1948 births
Living people
Writers from Andhra Pradesh
Recipients of the Sahitya Akademi Award in Telugu
Telugu writers
People from Chittoor district
Indian schoolteachers